Mao Tse Tung is a 2007 Albanian comedy film directed by Besnik Bisha. It was entered into the 30th Moscow International Film Festival., attracting some international reviews. FIPRESCI's Francisco Ferreira praised the film stating that it "transcends its picturesque backdrops and its sui generis view of Marxism to reflect on the history and mythology of a nation" while Emanuel Levy  reports on the "audiences' appreciative laughter."

Cast
 Fadil Hasa as Hekuran Romalini
 Miola Sitaj as Sulltana Romalini
 Ola Sadiku as Xhina
 Marko Bitraku as Myslymi
 Vangjel Toçe as Tahiri
 Zehrudin Dokle as Abdiu

References

External links
 

2007 films
2007 comedy films
Albanian-language films
Albanian comedy films